Events from the year 1688 in Denmark.

Incumbents
 Monarch – Christian V

Events
 3 August – the Royal Pawn is created by royal ordinance.

Births
 31 October – Jacob Benzon, nobleman and Governor-general of Norway (died 1775)

Deaths
 1 June
 Peder Hansen Resen, historian (born 1625)
 Nicolai Esmit, Governor of the Danish West Indies
 4 August – Sophie Amalie Lindenov, noblewoman and landowner (born 1649)

References

 
Denmark
Years of the 17th century in Denmark